Joseph N. Hall (born January 8, 1966) is an American author, software developer and programming consultant. Hall is known in the Perl programming community as the author of the book Effective Perl Programming with Randal L. Schwartz, and as a contributor of software to the CPAN.

In the mid-1970s, Hall received US media coverage as a child prodigy and as a survivor of childhood acute lymphoblastic leukemia.

Bibliography
Effective Perl Programming, 

Interviews
 Tomorrow with Tom Snyder, television interview, 1975
 ABC Evening News, news feature, November 21, 1975

References

1966 births
Living people
American technology writers

American computer programmers

Free software programmers